Friedrichsberg is a station on the Hamburg-Altona link line and served by the trains of Hamburg S-Bahn lines S1 and S11. The station was originally opened in 1906 and is located in the Hamburg district of Dulsberg, Germany. Dulsberg is part of the borough of Hamburg-Nord.

History 
The station was opened in 1906, and electrified a year later.

Service 
The lines S1 and S11 of Hamburg S-Bahn call at Friedrichsberg station.

The Station contains a Bakery a Kiosk and a Döner/Kebap Store.

Gallery

See also 

 Hamburger Verkehrsverbund (HVV)
 List of Hamburg S-Bahn stations

References

External links 

 Line and route network plans at hvv.de 

Hamburg S-Bahn stations in Hamburg
Buildings and structures in Hamburg-Nord
Railway stations in Germany opened in 1906